William Devereux may refer to:

 William Devereux (died after 1110), Anglo-Norman nobleman
 William Devereux (1219–1265), Marcher Lord
 William Devereux (died 1376/7), knight in Herefordshire
 William Devereux, Baron Devereux of Lyonshall (died 1314), Marcher Lord
 William Devereux of Frome (died 1336), knight
 William Devereux of Frome (1314–1384), member of Parliament